Lydia Capolicchio (born 7 January 1964) is a Swedish journalist and hostess.

Born in Borås, Sweden, from an Italian father and a Slovene mother, Capolicchio is best known for hosting the Eurovision Song Contest 1992, alongside Harald Treutiger, held in Malmö. In 2001 she hosted the Miss Sweden pageants.

See also
 List of Eurovision Song Contest presenters

References

1964 births
Living people
Swedish journalists
Swedish people of Italian descent
Swedish people of Slovenian descent